Disinhibited attachment disorder  (DAD) according to the International Classification of Diseases (ICD-10), is defined as:

"A particular pattern of abnormal social functioning that arises during the first five years of life and that tends to persist despite marked changes in environmental circumstances, e.g. diffuse, nonselectively focused attachment behaviour, attention-seeking and indiscriminately friendly behaviour, poorly modulated peer interactions; depending on circumstances there may also be associated emotional or behavioural disturbance." – F94.2 of the ICD-10.

Disinhibited attachment disorder is a subtype of the ICD-10 category F94, "Disorders of social functioning with onset specific to childhood and adolescence". The other subtype of F94 is reactive attachment disorder of childhood (RAD – F94.1). A similar disorder is institutional syndrome.

Within the ICD-10 category scheme, disinhibited attachment disorder specifically excludes Asperger syndrome (F84.5), hospitalism in children (F43.2), and attention deficit hyperactivity disorder (F90.-).

Comparison with the DSM-IV
The DSM-IV distinguishes two categories of RAD: an inhibited subtype and a disinhibited subtype (in the DSM it is listed as 313.89 under infant diagnoses). The ICD-10 describes the former, emotionally withdrawn subtype as RAD and the latter subtype as Disinhibited Attachment Disorder (DAD) (Zeanah et al., 2004).

Generally, the DSM-IV criteria for the inhibited subtype of RAD were generated by studies done on children who were maltreated or abused. Criteria for the DSM-IV disinhibited subtype of RAD were based on research on children raised in institutions (Zeanah, 1996). This is largely based on the fact that inhibited subtype of RAD is more prevalent in maltreated children, and the disinhibited subtype of RAD is more prevalent in children raised in institutions (Zeanah, 2000).

Studies
In a study by Zeanah, (Zeanah et al., 2004) on reactive attachment disorder in maltreated toddlers, the criteria for DSM-IV disinhibited RAD (i.e. disinhibited attachment disorder) were:

 not having a discriminated, preferred attachment figure, 
 not checking back after venturing away from the caregiver, 
 lack of reticence with unfamiliar adults, 
 a willingness to go off with relative strangers.

For comparison, the criteria for DSM-IV inhibited RAD were:

 absence of a discriminated, preferred adult,
 lack of comfort-seeking for distress,
 failure to respond to comfort when offered,
 lack of social and emotional reciprocity, and
 emotion regulation difficulties.

The authors found that these two disorders were not completely independent; a few children may exhibit symptoms of both types of the disorder.

See also
 Attachment disorder
 Reactive attachment disorder

Sources

External links 

Attachment theory
Human development
Mental disorders diagnosed in childhood